Salerm Cosmetics Puente Genil Fútbol Club, commonly referred to as Puente Genil, is a Spanish football team based in Puente Genil, in the autonomous community of Andalusia.

History

Founded in 1939 as Genil Racing Club, the club changed its name to Puente Genil Balompié in 1941 and subsequently to CD Pontanés in 1950. It first reached the national competitions in 1955, playing in Tercera División and achieving immediate promotion after finishing fourth.

During the club's first season in Segunda División, it changed its name to Puente Genil CF. After suffering immediate relegation, the club also dropped a division in 1960 and folded in 1973.

In 1988 another Puente Genil CF was founded, after the merger of Puente Genil Industrial (founded in 1974) and CD Pontanés. The club played three seasons in the fourth category before being dissolved in 1995.

Puente Genil FC started to play in the regional leagues in 2000, and in 2010 the club changed its name to CD AD San Fermín. A partnership with cosmetics industry Salerm Cosmetics followed, and the club's name was changed officially to CD AD San Fermín Salerm Cosmetics. In 2018 the name was changed to Salerm Cosmetics Puente Genil FC mainly due to its previous history.

Season to season

Puente Genil (1939–1960)
As Puente Genil Balompié

As CD Pontanés

As Puente Genil CF (1956)

1 season in Segunda División
4 seasons in Tercera División

Puente Genil Industrial CF

Puente Genil (1983–1995)

3 seasons in Tercera División

Puente Genil (1994–)
As Puente Genil FC

As CD AD San Fermín

As Puente Genil FC

4 seasons in Tercera División
1 season in Tercera División RFEF

References

External links
 
Soccerway team profile
Fútbol regional team profile 

Football clubs in Andalusia
Association football clubs established in 1994
1994 establishments in Spain
Segunda División clubs
Province of Córdoba (Spain)